Ninnes is the name of several places:
 Ninnes, Cornwall
 Ninnes Bridge, Cornwall
 Ninnes, South Australia, locality and former village
District Council of Ninnes, former local government
Hundred of Ninnes, cadastral division